Reino Niemi (23 January 1914 – 1966) was a Finnish chess player, Finnish Chess Championship medalist (1938, 1945).

Biography
From the late 1930s to the early 1950s, Reino Niemi was one of Finland's leading chess players. In Finnish Chess Championships he has won two silver (1938, 1945) medals.

Reino Niemi played for Finland in the Chess Olympiad:
 In 1950, at third board in the 9th Chess Olympiad in Dubrovnik (+0, =3, -4).

References

External links

Reino Niemi chess games at 365chess.com

1914 births
1966 deaths
Finnish chess players
Chess Olympiad competitors
20th-century chess players